Cailungo is a village (curazia) in central San Marino. It belongs to the castle of Borgo Maggiore.

Geography
The village is located at the north of its castle seat, and its main road is via Ca' dei Lunghi. It is divided in Cailungo di Sopra (Upper C.) and Cailungo di Sotto (Lower C.).

Infrastructures
Cailungo is the seat of the Sanmarinese State Hospital (Ospedale di Stato di San Marino) and the State Agency for Public Services of San Marino (Azienda Autonoma di Stato per i Servizi Pubblici).

Sport
The local football team is the Cailungo.

Oratorio di San Rocco
The church, Oratorio di San Rocco, was originally built in connection with a plague in the Middle Ages in honour of San Rocco. The interior has an oil on canvas painting of Madonna and Child and St. John the Baptist dated to 1594.

See also
Borgo Maggiore
Cà Melone
Cà Rigo
San Giovanni sotto le Penne
Valdragone
Ventoso

References

Curazie in San Marino
Borgo Maggiore